Nathan Fake is an English electronic music artist from Necton in Norfolk, England, who has released singles as well as three albums on the label Border Community Recordings.

In 2006, his debut album Drowning in a Sea of Love was released on Border Community. He released a six track mini-album, Hard Islands in 2009.  His third album Steam Days followed in 2012.

In 2014, Fake founded the label Cambria Instruments with Wesley Matsell, the inaugural release being a split single between the two artists.

In February 2020, Fake announced his fifth studio album called Blizzards would be released by Cambria Instruments on 3 April 2020.

In April 2021, Fake released the Sanxenxo EP on Cambria Instruments, recorded during the BLIZZARDS album jam sessions.

On 22 February 2023, Fake announced his sixth studio album Crystal Vision to be released on 7 April 2023, releasing the lead single The Grass, a collaboration with American musician Wizard Apprentice, on the same day.

Discography

Albums
 Drowning in a Sea of Love (20 March 2006) – Border Community
 Hard Islands (27 April 2009) – Border Community
 Steam Days (3 September 2012) – Border Community
 Providence (10 March 2017) – Ninja Tune
 Blizzards (3 April 2020) – Cambria Instruments
 Crystal Vision (7 April 2023) - Cambria Instruments

Singles and EPs

 Outhouse (2003) – Border Community
 Watlington Street EP (2004) – Saw Recordings
 The Sky Was Pink (2004) – Border Community
 Dinamo EP (2005) – Traum Schallplatten
 Silent Night (2005) – Border Community (7" release)
 Drowning in a Sea of Remixes (Remix EP) (2006) – Border Community
 You Are Here (2007) – Border Community
 Iceni Strings (2012) – Border Community
 Paean (2013) – Border Community
 CAMBRIA01 (Split 12" with Wesley Matsell) (2014) – Cambria Instruments
 GLAIVE (2015) – Cambria Instruments
 Degreelessness (2016) – Ninja Tune
 Providence Reworks - Part 1 –  Ninja Tune
 Providence Reworks - Part 2 –  Ninja Tune
 Sunder (2018) – Ninja Tune
 Sanxenxo (2021) – Cambria Instruments
 Sandstone (2021) – Cambria Instruments
 The Grass (2023) – Cambria Instruments

Remixes

 Avus – "Real (Nathan Fake Remix)" – Border Community (2004)
 Perc – "Closer (Nathan Fake Remix)" – Premier Sounds (2004)
 DJ Remy – "Scrambled (Nathan Fake Remix)" – Additive Records (2004)
 Steve Lawler – "Out at Night (Nathan's Night In)" – Subversive Records (2004)
 Tiefschwarz – "Isst (Nathan Fake Remix)" – Fine Records (2005)
 Shocking Pinks – "Dressed To Please (Nathan Fake Remix)" – DFA Records (2008)
 Vincent Oliver – "Clouds in The Haeds (Nathan Fake Remix)" – Lo Recordings (2008)
 Starting Teeth – "Venom (Nathan Fake Remix)" – Creaked Records (2009)
 Grasscut – "Muppet (Nathan Fake Remix)" – Ninja Tune (2010)
 Jon Hopkins – "Wire (Nathan Fake Remix)" – Double Six Recordings (2010)
 Walls – "Gaberdine" – Kompakt (2010)
 PVT – "Light Up Bright Fires (Nathan Fake Remix)" – Warp Records (2010)
 Radiohead – "Morning Mr Magpie (Nathan Fake Rmx)" (2011)
 Neon Jung – "Delirium Tremens (Nathan Fake Remix)" – Magic Wire Recordings (2012)
 Clark – "Growls Garden (Nathan Fake Remix)" – Warp Records (2013)
 Dorian Concept – "Draft Culture (Nathan Fake Remix)" – Ninja Tune (2015)
 Ultraísta – "Party Line (Nathan Fake Remix)" – Partisan Records (2019)
 Dominik Eulberg – "Dreizehnspecht (Nathan Fake Remix)" – Studio !K7 (2020)
 Irène Drésel – "Chambre2 (Nathan Fake Remix)" – Room Records (2020)
 Christian Löffler – "Roth feat. Mohna (Nathan Fake Remix)" – Ki Records (2020)
 Damian Lazarus – "Into The Sun (Nathan Fake Remix)" – Crosstown Rebels (2020)
 Sophie Hutchings – "Orange Glow (Nathan Fake Remix)" – Mercury KX (2020)
 GoGo Penguin – "Open (Nathan Fake Remix)" – Decca Records France (2021)
 The Micronaut – "Archery (Nathan Fake Remix)" – Ki Records (2021)

Compilation appearances

 "The Sky Was Pink" - Fear & Loathing 2, Mixed by Luke Slater - Resist Music (2004)
 "Numb Chance" – Elektronische Musik: Interkontinental 5 – Traum Schallplatten (2006)
 "Laluna" – #savefabric – Fabric Records & Houndstooth (2016)

Collaborations
 "Lava Flow" (collaboration with Milky Globe) (2006) – LoEB

Television
 The track "Grandfathered" was used in an ad for the Motorola Pebl phone and in the television programme Charlie Brooker's Screenwipe.
 The track "You Are Here" was used in the CSI: Miami episode "Miami Confidential". The FortDax remix is used as the theme tune to BBC Four's Newswipe with Charlie Brooker and Charlie Brooker's Weekly Wipe.

References

Living people
English record producers
English electronic musicians
1983 births
People from Breckland District
Progressive house musicians
Musicians from Norfolk